The Cadillac XT4 is a subcompact luxury crossover SUV manufactured by General Motors since 2018 under the luxury Cadillac marque.

Overview

The XT4 (short for "Crossover Touring 4") is Cadillac's second crossover SUV, slotting below the mid-size Cadillac XT5, serving as the luxury equivalent to the Chevrolet Equinox and GMC Terrain. It is the third model to use Cadillac's new alphanumeric naming scheme (after the CT6 and XT5), and the second of three vehicles Cadillac is introducing in the Crossover Touring (XT) series, the third being the mid-sized three-row XT6 that debuted in 2019 as a 2020 model.  It utilizes GM's E2 platform, shared with the Chevrolet Malibu and Opel Insignia/Buick Regal.

Cadillac introduced a teaser for the XT4 during a telecast of the 90th Academy Awards on March 4, 2018, and it made its official debut at the 2018 New York Auto Show on March 27, 2018. Cadillac started taking customer pre-orders shortly following the New York debut.

The XT4 is produced at GM's Fairfax Assembly plant, and went on sale in the fall of 2018 as a 2019 model.  The Chinese-market XT4 is manufactured in Shanghai by SAIC-GM.

Powertrain
The XT4 launched with an all-new turbocharged 2.0 liter four-cylinder engine, featuring Active Fuel Management and a start-stop system. It will be paired with a nine-speed automatic transmission, with either front-wheel or all-wheel drive.

Trim levels
Trim levels on the XT4 include "Luxury", "Premium Luxury", and "Sport".

Sales

References

External links

 

XT4
Cars introduced in 2018
Luxury crossover sport utility vehicles
2020s cars